The graduate nurse (GN) is a nurse who has completed their academic studies but not completed the requirements to become a registered nurse (RN). Depending on the country, state, province or similar licensing body, the graduate nurse may be granted provisional nursing licensure. A graduate nurse has not yet passed the National Council Licensure Examination (NCLEX-RN) to become a registered nurse (RN).

In some US states, the graduate nurse can practice nursing under a registered nurse. To practice as a graduate nurse, they must have been authorized by the examination provider to sit for the licensed examination and have been provided documentation for their eligibility to take the examination. Those who have been recognized and approved by the State board of Nursing may use the "G.N." status as part of their identification. In Canada and Texas, a student who has successfully completed their nursing education can obtain a distinct licensure as a graduate nurse. This designation remains until the GN successfully passes the RN examinination.
In Australia graduate nurses have experienced some issues transitioning from undergraduate to registered nurse.

See also
 Enrolled Nurse Professional Association
 Licensed practical nurse
 Nurse
 Nursing
 Registered nurse (RN)

External links

 National Council of State Boards of Nursing National Organization that publishes standards for the licensing of Nurses.

References

Health care occupations